Brian Handley (21 June 1936 – 5 March 1982) was an English football centre-forward. He was born in Wakefield, West Yorkshire.

Handley joined Aston Villa in September 1957 from Goole Town, but had to wait until the 1959–60 season for his league debut. He moved to Torquay United in September 1960, scoring 32 goals in 82 games for Eric Webber's side before dropping into non-league football.

In February 1966, he joined Rochdale from Bridgwater Town, but played only three times before leaving league football once more.

References

1936 births
1982 deaths
Footballers from Wakefield
English footballers
Goole Town F.C. players
Aston Villa F.C. players
Torquay United F.C. players
Bridgwater Town F.C. players
Rochdale A.F.C. players
Association football forwards